The 1925 Campeonato de Portugal Final was the final match of the 1924–25 Campeonato de Portugal, the 4th season of the Campeonato de Portugal, the Portuguese football knockout tournament, organized by the Portuguese Football Federation (FPF). The match was played on 28 June 1925 at the Campo de Monserrate in Viana do Castelo, and opposed Porto and Sporting CP. Porto defeated Sporting CP 2–1 to claim their second Campeonato de Portugal.

Match

Details

References

1925
1924–25 in Portuguese football
FC Porto matches
Sporting CP matches